The 1913 VMI Keydets football team represented the Virginia Military Institute (VMI) in their 23rd season of organized football. The Keydets had a 7–1–2 record under head coach Henry Poague.

Schedule

References

VMI
VMI Keydets football seasons
VMI Keydets football